Nailah Rowe (born 10 September 2001) is a footballer who plays as a forward for the Centennial Colts. Born in Canada, she represents the Guyana women's national team.

College career
In 2019, she began attending Centennial College playing for the women's soccer team. In her first year, she scored 12 goals in nine games. She finished as the 2019 OCAA Rookie of the Year, OCAA East Rookie of the Year, OCAA East Co-Scoring Champion, and was named an OCAA East 1st Team All-Star. On September 21, 2021, she scored four goals against Fleming College. In her second season in 2021, she was named East Division Player of the Year and an East Division All-Star, after scoring nine goals in six games.

Club career
In 2019, Rowe played for FC Oshawa in League1 Ontario, scoring twice in 8 league matches and making 1 playoff appearance. She scored her first goal on May 10 against Hamilton United.

International career
Rowe made her debut for the Guyana senior team at the 2018 CFU Women's Challenge Series on April 25 against Grenada.

Rowe represented Guyana at the 2020 CONCACAF Women's U-20 Championship qualifying stage and 2020 CONCACAF Women's U-20 Championship. She scored her first goal on July 19, 2019, at the qualifying tournament against Saint Lucia U20.

See also
List of Guyana women's international footballers

References

2001 births
Living people
Citizens of Guyana through descent
Guyanese women's footballers
Women's association football forwards
Guyana women's international footballers
Canadian women's soccer players
Centennial College alumni
FC Oshawa players
Canadian sportspeople of Guyanese descent
Black Canadian women's soccer players
League1 Ontario (women) players